(stylized as audio-technica) is a Japanese company that designs and manufactures professional microphones, headphones, turntables, phonographic magnetic cartridges, and other audio equipment.

Company history 

Audio-Technica was established in 1962 in Shinjuku, Tokyo, Japan, by Hideo Matsushita as a phonograph cartridge manufacturer. Its first products were the AT-1 and the AT-3 MM stereo phono cartridges. Business rapidly developed, and Audio-Technica expanded into other fields. The headquarters and factory moved in 1965 to the current address in Naruse, Machida, Tokyo.  In 1969, the company began exporting phono cartridges worldwide and launched the first microcassette recorders.

In 1972, Audio-Technica established its US arm in Fairlawn, Ohio, and started shipping VM phono cartridges to European manufacturers. In 1974, the company developed its first headphones, the AT-700 series, launched the same year. The AT-800 series of microphones were introduced in 1978, and in the same year, the UK establishment in Leeds began operation.

In the 1980s, with the growth in digital music formats threatening their core business of phonograph cartridges, Audio-Technica begun a period of diversification. Employee suggestions were solicited, with sushi machines among the ideas selected for further development.

In 1984, Audio-Technica introduced the ASM50 Nigirikko, a nigiri-forming appliance for home kitchens, which incorporated a turn-table like mechanism to deposit the nigiri onto. The market success of this product led the company to develop a range of sushi machinery for commercial and industrial use. Audio-Technica remains one of the largest manufacturers of sushi machines globally today, with products marketed under the brand AUTEC.

In 1986, the company developed RCA cables with high-purity copper produced from the continuous metal casting process (PCOCC), invented and developed between 1982 and 1985 by Atsumi Ohno. In the same year, the company launched the AT33ML/OCC phono cartridge, the first made with PCOCC materials. In 1988, another Audio-Technica subsidiary is founded in Taiwan.

In 1990s, Audio-Technica introduced several large-diaphragm condenser microphones for studio use: the AT4033 cardioid microphone in 1991, the AT4050 multi-pattern in 1995, and the AT4060 vacuum tube cardioid microphone in 1998; the AT895, a DSP-controlled five-element microphone array providing adaptive directional audio acquisition, was introduced in 1999. In 1996, the Southeast Asian establishment began operation in Singapore.

In 2008, the company celebrated the 20th anniversary of supplying microphones for US Presidential Debates. For their 50th anniversary, Audio-Technica celebrated at Consumer Electronics Show 2012, debuting their AT-LP1240-USB USB DJ Turntable and ATH-CKS55i.

In 2017, Audio-Technica Pure Digital Drive Wireless Headphone ATH-DSR9BT received CES Innovation Honoree Awards by using Trigence Dnote Technology.

Audio equipment supplier 
Since the late 1990s, Audio-Technica supplied microphones and headphones for US television shows such as the Big Brother, Deal or No Deal, the Rock and Roll Hall of Fame inductions and several international events:

Technology

One of their most famous products was a battery-operated, portable record player called Mister Disc that was sold in the U.S. in the early 1980s.

In 2005, Audio-Technica developed "Uniguard", a method for making microphones resistant to radio frequency interference from cell phones, Bluetooth devices, wireless computer networks and walkie-talkies. 13 patents were involved in bringing the feature to fruition, as company engineers modified many different elements of microphone construction and operation. Over 50 existing Audio-Technica microphone models have been upgraded with the new RFI-resistant technology.

See also
 Sound Burger
 Audio Engineer

 List of microphone manufacturers
 Audio-Technica Headphones
 List of phonograph manufacturers

References

External links

Audio equipment manufacturers of Japan
Headphones manufacturers
Microphone manufacturers
Phonograph manufacturers
Japanese brands
Electronics companies established in 1962
Japanese companies established in 1962
Manufacturing companies based in Tokyo